Marie Minnaert (born 5 May 1999) is a Belgian footballer who plays as a midfielder for Anderlecht and the Belgium women's national team.

Career statistics 

Scores and results list Belgium's goal tally first, score column indicates score after each Minnaert goal.

References

External links
 
 statistics 

1999 births
Living people
Belgian women's footballers
Women's association football midfielders
Belgium women's international footballers
UEFA Women's Euro 2022 players
K.A.A. Gent (women) players
Club Brugge KV (women) players
RSC Anderlecht (women) players